The 1963 Italian Athletics Championships was the 53rd edition of the Italian Athletics Championships and were held in Trieste (track & field events).

Other venues and dates
The events of combined events, half marathon, marathon, racewalking road and cross country running, were not held in the main venue Trieste, but in other locations and other dates.
 Formia, 26-27 October (combined events)
 Recco, 23 June (20 km race walk road)
 Naples, 29 September (50 km race walk road)
 Sassari, 1 September (half marathon)
 Reggio Calabria, 15 November (marathon)
 Rome, 3 March (cross-country running men)
 Camerlata, 12 March (cross-country running women)

Champions

Men

Women

References

External links 
 Italian Athletics Federation

Italian Athletics Championships
Athletics
Italian Athletics Outdoor Championships
Athletics competitions in Italy